Clearview Cinemas was a chain of movie theatres within the New York metropolitan area. Most of the Clearview Cinema locations were purchased by Bow Tie Cinemas in April 2013.

A subsidiary of Cablevision from 1998 to 2013, Clearview Cinemas was formed in 1994 through a group led by Bud Mayo and was listed as a public company on the American Stock Exchange on August 19, 1997. As of April 2013, it operated 47 movie theatres with 253 screens in the New York metropolitan area, including the famous Ziegfeld Theatre in New York City.

Acquisition by Bow Tie Cinemas
Forty-one of the Clearview Cinema locations were purchased by Ridgefield, Connecticut-based Bow Tie Cinemas. The acquisition was announced on April 29, 2013, and made Bow Tie the largest exhibitor in the metropolitan New York area and the eighth-largest chain in the nation.

Bow Tie also managed the Ziegfeld Theatre in New York, although Cablevision retained ownership. The Chelsea Cinemas in New York City became Bow Tie's Manhattan flagship venue, and it will continue to host events, including the Tribeca Film Festival.

Loyalty programs
Clearview Cinemas offered a loyalty program called Clear Advantage. Additionally, Cablevision partnered with Clearview Cinemas to offer Optimum Rewards members "Free Movie Tuesdays" and other discounts.

References

External links

 Bow Tie Cinemas official website

Movie theatre chains in the United States
Former cinemas in the United States